Sawyer Barth (born November 7, 2001) is an American actor, known for his role as Flake in And Then I Go and Frank Cleary in the ABC sitcom The Kids Are Alright.

Biography and Career 
A native of West Long Branch, New Jersey, he received acting lessons at the age of 11 and has been actively involved in the entertainment industry for most of his life, starring in plays, movies, and TV shows, including plays such as Bang Bang You're Dead and Lost Angels. He is also active in soccer.

In And Then I Go, Barth played Flake, the main character's best friend. He had originally auditioned for Edwin, but was instead called back to be cast for the role of Flake. A critic commented, "Darbo [playing the main character] and Barth both prove exceptionally receptive to the filmmakers’ sometimes surprising guidance by exhibiting contrasting responses. Barth excels at concentrating the frustration that an uncaring family and educational system foist upon Flake into sudden bursts of uncontained rage." Barth himself described the experience, stating in an interview, "They yelled 'Cut,' and then I walked out of the gym just to take a breather. I handed over my gun—which wasn't a prop gun, it was a real gun it just wasn't loaded—to the ammunition handlers, and I just walked outside for a second. It was way more intense, that felt way more real than I expected. Pointing that thing at an actual human and pretending to shoot them… it's something that shouldn't physically be done."

In 2018, Barth was cast as Frank Cleary in the ABC show The Kids Are Alright. In 2019, he made a cameo in CBS's God Friended Me as Jacob Abbott.

Filmography

Film

Television

References

External links 
 
 
 The Kids Are Alright bio

2001 births
Living people
Male actors from New Jersey
American male actors
American male film actors
American male television actors
People from West Long Branch, New Jersey